The Parachute Years: 1977–1981 is a compilation album 7-CD box set by John Zorn. It features recordings of Zorn's game pieces originally released as self-produced albums on the Parachute label as well as previously unreleased performances. All of the discs in this box set have been subsequently given their own releases on Zorn's Tzadik label.

The first two discs feature Zorn's 1977 composition Lacrosse. The first disc was recorded at WKCR in June 1978 and features Mark Abbott, Polly Bradfield, Eugene Chadbourne, and LaDonna Smith and Zorn on 6 different takes of "Lacrosse". Takes 3, 4 and 6 were originally released on the Parachute Records double LP School (1978). The second disc is the original recording of "Lacrosse" which was made by Eugene Chadbourne, Henry Kaiser, Bruce Ackley, and Zorn (dubbed "Twins") in San Francisco, California in June 1977. The third disc features 17 takes (four electric and thirteen acoustic) of the composition Hockey. Five of these takes were first released on vinyl on Parachute Records in 1980, (tracks 4-9), along with Pool which features on disc four. The final three discs feature Zorn's Archery composition in previously unreleased rehearsal takes and versions released on Parachute Records in 1982.

Reception

The Allmusic review by Joslyn Layne awarded the album 4 stars stating "This box set is for dedicated fans already intrigued by the early annals of Zorn and his musical game theories. However, Zorn skeptics and listeners with less patience for theory (or history) should definitely avoid The Parachute Years. This set will not win anyone over; nor will the theories become more clear upon listening. The recordings in The Parachute Years helped the participants -- inspired and creative musicians, all -- to grow, but they also have more historical value than listening interest.". 

The Penguin Guide to Jazz said "Historically this is arguably as important a set as any Blue Note or Prestige milestone... one can often hear things in this collection which echo more vividly than much of Zorn's more obvious 'outrageous' work". 

In Jazziz Bruce Carnevale wrote "This is  not "music" in terms of traditional rhythm, tonal centres, or anything of that sort. It's hardly even free jazz. Formed by Zorn's formal instructions or moves chosen by the player, the recordings collected here present a discontinuous world of discrete sounds. Zorn's signature jump-cut aesthetic s on display throughout the box. Here, however, a rawness takes form. This music bristles with energy that turns on and off as easily as a light switch".

Track listing
Disc one
"Lacrosse Take 3" – 23:06
"Lacrosse Take 4" – 19:06
"Lacrosse Take 6" – 6:20
"Lacrosse Take 1" – 7:01
"Lacrosse Take 2" – 8:08
"Lacrosse Take 5" – 8:16
Disc two
"Lacrosse Twins Version" – 29:56
Disc three
 "Hockey (Electric Version): Take 1" - 1:13
 "Hockey (Electric Version): Take 2" - 3:13
 "Hockey (Electric Version): Take 3" - 11:32
 "Hockey (Electric Version): Take 4" - 11:23
 "Hockey (Acoustic Version): Take 2" - 3:43
 "Hockey (Acoustic Version): Take 4" - 2:14
 "Hockey (Acoustic Version): Take 11" - 0:55
 "Hockey (Acoustic Version): Take 13" - 1:02
 "Hockey (Acoustic Version): Take 1" - 3:10
 "Hockey (Acoustic Version): Take 3" - 3:16
 "Hockey (Acoustic Version): Take 5" - 1:08
 "Hockey (Acoustic Version): Take 6" -1:00
 "Hockey (Acoustic Version): Take 7" - 1:07
 "Hockey (Acoustic Version): Take 8" - 0:45
 "Hockey (Acoustic Version): Take 9" - 1:02
 "Hockey (Acoustic Version): Take 10" - 1:07
 "Hockey (Acoustic Version): Take 12" - 1:17
Disc four
 "Pool" - 50:45
Disc five
 "Archery Rehearsal: Pt. 1" - 32:11
 "Archery Rehearsal: Pt. 2" - 16:14
 "Archery Rehearsal: Pt. 3" - 28:33
Disc six
 "Archery: A1-D2" - 20:35
 "Archery: D3-G1" - 20:08
Disc seven
 "Archery: G2-L4" - 23:52
 "Archery: L5-O14" - 23:30

All compositions by John Zorn

Personnel
Disc One and Two
John Zorn – alto saxophone,  clarinet, soprano saxophone, liner notes
Mark Abbott – electronics
Bruce Ackley – soprano saxophone, liner notes
Allen Asaf – engineer
Polly Bradfield – violin, viola, electric violin
Eugene Chadbourne – acoustic guitar, dobro, electric guitar, twelve string guitar, liner notes, tiple, six string bass, twelve string acoustic guitar
Henry Kaiser – electric guitar
LaDonna Smith – violin, viola
Davey Williams – banjo, electric guitar, hollow body guitar

 Disc One recorded at WKCR in June 1978 and Disc Two recorded in San Francisco, California in June 1977.

Disc Three
Polly Bradfield - Violin
Mark E. Miller - percussion, Contact Microphones, Vibraphone
Eugene Chadbourne - Electric Guitar, Personal Effects
Wayne Horvitz - Amplified Piano
Bob Ostertag - Electronics
John Zorn - Duck, Goose and Crow Calls, Clarinet, Mouthpiece

Recorded at Sorcerer Sound Studio, New York City on March 1, 1980

Disc Four
Polly Bradfield - Violin
Mark E. Miller - percussion, Contact Microphones, Vibraphone
Charles K. Noyes - percussion, Saw, Knene
Bob Ostertag - Electronics
John Zorn - Alto And Soprano Saxophones, Bb Clarinet, Game Calls, E-flat Clarinet

Recorded at Sorcerer Sound Studio, New York City on March 1, 1980

Disc Five, Six and Seven
Polly Bradfield - Violin
Eugene Chadbourne - Guitars, Dobro
Anthony Coleman - keyboards
Tom Cora - Cello
Robert Dick - Flute, Bass Flute, Piccolo, Game Calls
Wayne Horvitz - keyboards, Harmonica, Tape, Electronics
Bill Horvitz - Electric Guitar
Kramer - keyboards
Bill Laswell - Electric Bass
George Lewis - Trombone
David Moss - drums, Voice, Water, Hammered dulcimer, cymbals, Zither, etc.
John Zorn - Alto And Soprano Saxophones, Bb Clarinet, Game Calls, E-flat Clarinet

Recorded at the OAO Studio in Brooklyn, New York on September 12 and 13, 1981

References

John Zorn compilation albums
1997 compilation albums
Tzadik Records compilation albums
Albums recorded at WKCR-FM